On Time is a 1969 album by Grand Funk Railroad.

On Time may also refer to:

Music
On Time (Les McCann album) or the title song, 1962
On Time, an album by Ilegales, 2001
On Time, an album by Mingo Fishtrap, 2014
"On Time" (song), by the Bee Gees, 1972
"On Time", a song by Ufo361, 2019

Other uses
On Time (film), a 1924 American film
OnTime, software by Axosoft
On Time, a poem in Milton's 1645 Poems